V45, V-45 or V.45 may refer to:

 , a German Imperial Navy torpedo boat
 a variant of the Honda Sabre motorcycle
 KSHV-TV, the MyNetworkTV affiliate in Shreveport
 Vanadium-45 (V-45 or 45V), an isotope of vanadium